During the 1945-1946 season Associazione Calcio Torino competed in Divisione Nazionale.

Summary 
Concluded the last Alta Italia Championship in July 1944, Torino FIAT after several months of rest, re-open trainings over winter, disputing 2 derbies for beneficial organizations trying to organize a spring tournament with Juventus-Cisitalia, Filiale Italia, Lancia e Ispettorato del Lavoro. Matches played in front of a massive attendances despite being beneficial. The championship Divisione Nazionale was disputed after the World War II with a format of groups being Torino the winner of the trophy.

Squad 

 (Captain)

Transfers

Competitions

Divisione Nazionale

Alta Italia Group

Matches

Final Round

Matches

Statistics

Squad statistics

Players statistics

Appearances
40.Valerio Bacigalupo 
40.Aldo Ballarin 
38.Eusebio Castigliano 
38.Pietro Ferraris 
35.Guglielmo Gabetto 
35.Giuseppe Grezar 
11.Oreste Guaraldo 
39.Ezio Loik
35.Virgilio Maroso 
36.Valentino Mazzola 
30.Franco Ossola 
10.Sergio Piacentini 
36.Mario Rigamonti 
16.Alfonso Santagiuliana 
2.Adriano Zecca

Goalscorers

2.Aldo Ballarin 
20.Eusebio Castigliano 
12.Pietro Ferraris 
22.Guglielmo Gabetto 
4.Giuseppe Grezar 
2.Oreste Guaraldo 
16.Ezio Loik 
16.Valentino Mazzola 
11.Franco Ossola 
1.Alfonso Santagiuliana

References

External links

See also
Grande Torino

Torino F.C. seasons
Torino
Italian football championship-winning seasons